The following is the qualification system and qualified countries for the cycling at the 2023 Pan American Games competition in Santiago, Chile.

Qualification system
A total of 283 cyclists (142 men and 141 women) will qualify to compete. 187 will qualify in road/track, 36 in mountain biking and 60 in BMX. Various events and rankings were used to determine the qualifiers. A nation could enter a maximum of 34 athletes, four in mountain biking (two per gender), six in BMX (three per gender) 18 in track (nine per gender) and six in road (three per gender). Chile as host nation, was automatically awarded the maximum quota of 34 spots.

Qualification timeline

Qualification summary
A total of 9 countries qualified cyclists so far.

BMX

Racing
A maximum of 21 male and 21 female athletes will be allowed to compete in BMX racing. The host nation (Chile) automatically receives the maximum of two quota spots per event, and all other nations may qualify a maximum of two athletes per event. Qualification will be done using the 2021 Junior Pan American Games and the UCI rankings as of December 31, 2022.

Men

Women

Freestyle
A maximum of nine male and nine female athletes will be allowed to compete in BMX freestyle. The host nation (Chile) automatically receives the maximum one quota spot per event, and all other nations may qualify a maximum of one athlete per event. All qualification will be done using the UCI rankings as of May 31, 2023.

Men

Women

Mountain biking
A maximum of 18 male and 18 female athletes will be allowed to compete in mountain biking. The host nation (Chile) automatically receives the maximum two quota spot per event, and all other nations may qualify a maximum of two athletes per event. Qualification will be done across four tournaments.

Men

Women

Road/Track
A maximum of 94 male and 93 female athletes will be allowed to compete in the road and track cycling events. The host nation (Chile) automatically receives the maximum 24 quotas (12 men and 12 women), and all other nations may qualify a maximum of 24 cyclists as well. Qualification was done across six tournaments and the UCI Rankings of March 31, 2023.

Men
Host 
The host nation Chile, is permitted to enter 12 male cyclists.

Junior Pan American Games
The winner of each event qualified.

Pan American Road Championships
At the Pan American Championships, the top six men in the individual time trial and top 13 in the road race will qualify, for a total of 19.

South American Games
The winner of each event qualified.

Pan American Track Championships
The top two in omnium, keirin and individual sprint qualified, along with the top 3 in the other three events.

Central American Championships
The top athlete in the road race qualified.

Caribbean Championships
The top athlete in the road race qualified.

UCI Ranking
The best NOC that has not qualified yet.

Women
Host 
The host nation Chile, is permitted to enter 12 female cyclists.

Junior Pan American Games
The winner of each event qualified.

Pan American Road Championships
At the Pan American Championships, the top six women in the individual time trial and top 13 in the road race will qualify, for a total of 19.

South American Games
The winner of each event qualified.

Pan American Track Championships
The top two in omnium, keirin and individual sprint qualified, along with the top 3 in the other three events.

Central American Championships
The top athlete in the road race qualified.

Caribbean Championships
The top athlete in the road race qualified.

UCI Ranking
The best NOC that has not qualified yet.

References

2022 in road cycling
2022 in track cycling
2022 in BMX
2022 in mountain biking
Qualification for the 2023 Pan American Games